is a train station located in Fushimi-ku, Kyoto, Kyoto Prefecture, Japan, operated by West Japan Railway Company (JR West). It has the station number "JR-D04".

Lines
JR Fujinomori Station is served by the Nara Line. The "JR" lettering serves as a distinguishment from Fujinomori Station on the Keihan Main Line. It is the only station of the Japan Railways Group with "JR" in its name since its opening. The stations  and  received their "JR" lettering only after they were renamed.

Layout
The station has two side platforms serving two tracks. The ticket office and gates are located upstairs on the ground level. The station does not have a Midori no Madoguchi ticket window, but a POS terminal.

Platforms

History 
JR Fujinomori Station opened on 8 March 1997.

Station numbering was introduced in March 2018 with JR Fujinomori being assigned station number JR-D04.

Passenger statistics
According to the Kyoto Prefecture statistical report, the average number of passengers per day is as follows.

References

External links

  

Railway stations in Japan opened in 1997
Railway stations in Kyoto Prefecture